Who's Gonna Fill Their Shoes is the 45th studio album by American country music artist George Jones, released in 1985 on the Epic Records label.

The album is best known for the title track and its classic video, which would go on to win the CMA Award for Video of the Year.  In the song, Jones sings of the irreplaceability of country music legends, including Waylon Jennings, Willie Nelson, Johnny Cash, Merle Haggard, Conway Twitty, Carl Perkins, Elvis Presley, Jerry Lee Lewis, Charlie Rich, Marty Robbins, Hank Williams and Lefty Frizzell.  The music video, which was directed by Marc Ball, takes place at a roadside gas station, where the owner shares with Jones his extensive collection of albums and memorabilia from classic country music artists.  It was the singer's first music video and featured him looking healthier than he had in years.  Jones' producer Billy Sherrill appears at the beginning of the video playing the bus driver.  At the end of the video, the driver of the Cadillac with bullhorns is James Morgan, he was the owner of the car, along with his wife Judy morgan they also created the nostalgic set for this video. James Morgan was a fixture on the 1980s Nashville music scene. Music executive Rick Blackburn is the man in the passenger seat of the Cadillac. 
As Bob Allen writes in his book George Jones: The Life and Times of a Honky Tonk Legend, the song "struck a strong enough chord of empathy with old-time country music lovers to end up number three in Billboard.

The album produced two other hit singles: the concert favorite "The One I Loved Back Then (The Corvette Song)", which also went to number 3, and the down-and-out honky tonk "cheatin and drinkin' song" "Somebody Wants Me Out Of The Way", which peaked at number 9.  Who's Gonna Fill Their Shoes also features a couple of duets with Lynn Anderson and Lacy J. Dalton.

Jones was promoting the album when he appeared at the inaugural Farm Aid benefit in 1985.

Track listing

Charts

Weekly charts

Year-end charts

References

External links
George Jones' Official Website
Record Label

George Jones albums
1985 albums
Albums produced by Billy Sherrill
Epic Records albums